Bobby Gets Going (German: Bobby geht los) is a 1931 German comedy action film directed by and starring Harry Piel and also featuring Annie Markart, Hilde Hildebrand and Kurt Lilien. It was shot at the EFA Studios in Halensee and on location around Berlin including at the Sportpalast. The film's sets were designed by the art director Gustav A. Knauer. It was based on a 1926 novel by Georg Mühlen-Schulte. It was distributed by the German branch of Universal Pictures.

Cast
 Harry Piel as Bob Morland
 Annie Markart as Marietta 
 Hilde Hildebrand as 	Olga Loty
 Kurt Lilien as 	Gurken-Karl
 Ferdinand Hart as Padube
 Erich Dunskus as Mertens
 Frank Günther as 	Majewski
 Gerhard Dammann as 	Der rote Jonas
 Kurt von Ruffin as 	Paul Romanow
 Fritz Odemar as Felix
 Fritz Steiner as 	Wiesel
 Alfred Beierle as 	Arena-Director
 Eugen Rex as 	Eine Type

References

Bibliography 
 Giesen, Rolf. The Nosferatu Story: The Seminal Horror Film, Its Predecessors and Its Enduring Legacy. McFarland, 2019.
 Klaus, Ulrich J. Deutsche Tonfilme: Jahrgang 1931. Klaus-Archiv, 1988.

External links 
 

1931 films
Films of the Weimar Republic
1931 comedy films
1930s action comedy films
German action comedy films
1930s German-language films
Films directed by Harry Piel
German black-and-white films
1930s German films
Films shot in Berlin
Universal Pictures films
Films based on German novels
Films shot at Halensee Studios